The SZD-12 Mucha 100 (Szybowcowy Zakład Doświadczalny - Glider Experimental Works) was a single-seat glider aircraft that was designed and built in Poland from 1953.

Development
The SZD-12 Mucha (Fly) 100 was derived from the IS-2 Mucha-ter for use by aero clubs throughout Poland. Two hundred and ninety were built with 73 exported to several countries and an unknown number were licence-built in the People's Republic of China (PRC).

Constructed from wood/plywood throughout, the Mucha 100 was much improved from the IS-2 Mucha, with smoother surfaces, better aerodynamics and comprehensive instruments and equipment including a KF-18 oxygen system, lighting and instruments for cloud flying. Pilot comfort was improved by slightly reclining the seat back and increasing legroom, and visibility was increased through a larger one-piece cockpit canopy. Schempp-Hirth style airbrakes replaced the DFS style airbrakes of the IS-2, external mass balances fitted to the ailerons cured the tendency to flutter. The wing incidence was reduced to 2° to better align the fuselage with the airflow at higher speeds, reducing drag. Main designer was Władysław Okarmus, constructors were Jan Dyrek and Zbigniew Badura. The prototype was made in ZSLS No.5 in Krosno - it was the only prototype of SZD design that was not made in the SZD works in Bielsko.

Flight trials commenced on 14 November 1953 in Krosno (first flight by Adam Zientek); a tendency to control surface flutter was resolved by mass balancing. After this and other improvements, the Mucha 100 was cleared for production as the SZD-12 Mucha 100. From 1954, 256 were built in ZSLS in Krosno, 14 in Gdańsk and 20 in Wrocław.

Further improvements were incorporated into the SZD-12A Mucha 100A, which had the external mass balances replaced by weights in the leading edges of the ailerons, forward of the hinges. Another modification which was also applied retrospectively to earlier units was a re-located mainwheel, moved rearwards to reduce the weight on the tailwheel during ground handling.

70 Mucha 100's were exported, mostly to the USSR, DDR, Italy, Switzerland and China in multiple orders; single examples were also exported to Austria, France, Finland and India.

Variants
SZD-12 Mucha 100 – initial production version, 104 built
SZD-12A Mucha 100A – modified version with altered undercarriage arrangement and internal aileron mass balances, 186 built from 1958

Specifications (SZD-12 Mucha 100)

See also

References

Taylor, J. H. (ed) (1989) Jane's Encyclopedia of Aviation. Studio Editions: London. p. 29
Simons, Martin. Sailplanes 1945-1965 2nd revised edition. EQIP Werbung und Verlag G.m.b.H.. Königswinter. 2006.

External links

http://www.piotrp.de/SZYBOWCE/pszd12.htm
http://www.aviationmuseum.eu/World/Europe/Poland/Krakow/Muzeum_Lotnictwa_Polskiego.htm
http://www.muzeumlotnictwa.pl/zbiory_sz.php?ido=89&w=a

1950s Polish sailplanes
SZD aircraft
Aircraft first flown in 1953